Miller Place High School is a public high school in the Miller Place Union Free School District along the north shore of Long Island, New York, United States. It is the only high school in the district and contains grades 9-12. The school has been ranked the 78th in the United States for the number of students taking AP classes.

In the 2020-21 school year, the school had an enrollment of 877 students and 73.30 classroom teachers (on a FTE basis, for a student-teacher ratio of 11.96.

Location
Miller Place High School is located in the hamlet of Miller Place, Suffolk County, New York. Unlike the three other district schools, it is located south of Rt. 25A. Miller Place High School is the only building of the Miller Place Union Free School District not on the original property.

Sports

The Miller Place High School Panthers badminton team remained undefeated for 504 straight games from 1973 until April 2005, when they were defeated by Smithtown High School.

Among the sports for the 2021-22 school year are the following

Fall

 Spirit/Sideline Cheer
 Cross Country (Boys & Girls)
 Field Hockey 
 Football
 Tennis (Girls)
 Volleyball (Girls)
 Soccer (Boys & Girls)
 Girls Gymnastics (Combined with William Floyd School District)
 Boys Golf (Combined with Comsewogue School District)

Winter

 Basketball (Boys & Girls)
 Competitive Cheer
 Winter/Indoor Track (Boys & Girls)
 Wrestling
 Fencing (Boys & Girls; Combined with Newfield High School)

Spring

 Badminton (Boys & Girls)
 Baseball (Boys)
 Lacrosse (Boys & Girls)
 Softball (Girls)
 Tennis (Boys)
 Track & Field (Boys & Girls)

Clubs
Among the clubs for the 2020-21 school year are the following 
Art Club
Athletes Helping Athletes
Bookaneers
Drama Club
GSA
Foreign Language National Honor Society
Mathletes
Mock Trial
National Honor Society
Natural Helpers
Pep Band
Student Government
Varsity Club
Yearbook Club
Service Club
Tri-Music Honor Society

References

External links
Miller Place School District website
Miller Place High School, National Center for Education Statistics

Public high schools in New York (state)
Brookhaven, New York
Schools in Suffolk County, New York